The UTSA Klesse College of Engineering and Integrated Design (CEID) houses The University of Texas at San Antonio's Engineering and Architectural, Construction and Planning programs. It was originally founded as the College of Engineering but was renamed to the Klesse College of Engineering and Integrated Design (CEID) in 2021.

CEID provides undergraduate degrees in the fields of Biomedical Engineering, Chemical Engineering, Civil and Environmental Engineering, Computer Engineering, Electrical Engineering, Mechanical Engineering, Construction Management, and Architecture & Planning. Graduate degrees are also offered in multiple areas, including Biomedical Engineering.

As Engineering students reach their senior year, they must choose a concentration. A concentration is a more specific area in one's field of study, where the student is required to take classes in that concentration. For electrical engineering, the concentrations offered are control systems, computer engineering, and communications.

The Engineering departments puts a heavy emphasis on engineering science and practical applications. Before graduation, an engineering student will have a firm foundation not only in the necessary mathematics, but also with computer applications that will be used in the engineering career field.

In 2021 The University of Texas at San Antonio announced the formal launch of the College of Engineering and Integrated Design (CEID). The new college combines the academic departments and programs under the College of Engineering and the College of Architecture, Construction and Planning. On December 9 of the same year, it was announced that the college would be renamed after former Valero CEO William R. Klesse who donated $20 million to the university.

Departments and Programs 

 Graduate Certificate of Specialization
 Undergraduate Certificate of Specialization

Facilities

The Biotechnology, Sciences and Engineering building opened in 2006, and hosts new opportunities for engineering students. The building has also received recognition in the architecture community for its design and purpose. The offices of biotechnology, civil engineering, and electrical engineering department members are located here. Research is being heavily done in the areas of MEMS, photonics, and digital image processing.

The original engineering building offers multiple computer labs, a microcomputer lab, a lab with Sun Microsystems computers for a course in digital systems design, and two labs for students in practical, hands-on courses. The original building serves as the location for the mechanical engineering faculty offices as well.

According to the master plan of UTSA, the university is expecting to receive another large engineering building, and new research facilities located on the east side of the campus by the year 2030. Special housing options would also be available for students doing research for the university.

The newest addition, is the Applied Engineering & Technology (AET) Building. It was recently opened fall of 2009, and includes a student study space, research labs, and interactive learning classrooms.

Student organizations
There are many student engineering organizations available to students.  Some of the student branches of nationally known organizations are:
ASCE – American Society of Civil Engineers for civil engineering students
ASEE – for exploring engineering education
ASHRAE – for students interested in heating, refrigeration, and air conditioning systems
ASME – for mechanical engineering students
Eta Kappa Nu – for electrical engineering honors students
Formula SAE – Society of Automotive Engineers for students to participate in a competition to race formula cars
IEEE – for electrical engineering students
ITE – for students interested in transportation issues
MAES – for Mexican-American engineers
NACME – for minority students who are pursuing the engineering profession
NSBE – for black engineering students pursuing the engineering profession
SAE – for students interested in automotive engineering
SHPE – for Hispanic engineering students
SWE – for women in engineering
Tau Beta Pi – for engineering honors students
TSPE – for students who wish to become professional engineers
SME – for students interested in manufacturing engineering
College of Engineering Student Council – Umbrella organization, involved in aiding all organizations, and independent projects.

Student body
Electrical engineering students make up the larger portion of the engineering student body, followed by mechanical engineering students and then civil engineering students.

Research

Electrical engineering
Electrical engineering faculty, funded by the Texas Higher Education Coordinating Board, conduct research in high performance multimedia processors and in muscle control using electromyographic signals. Research on 3-D spot counting is conducted in partnership with the Texas Engineering Experimental Station and on robotics and sensor based control and prognosis of complex distributed systems with the National Science Foundation.

The department is also working extensively in the areas of cyber security and homeland defense. Reliable and secure voice and data communications are important in mission success and in providing assurances to the public. Electromagnetic wave analysis regarding fallout may become necessary after a physical attack. Computer information security, high-speed intrusion detection, problem identification, reliable high-speed network design and redundancy are all important for cyber attack prevention; computer engineering faculty work with the Center for Infrastructure Assurance and Security in these efforts. Target analysis and radar signature identification help identify and track friends or foes.

Wireless communications that are hardened for recovery efforts are of great interest. An understanding of health physics is of particular importance in the case of nuclear and biological attack, and bio-MEMS (micro electromechanical systems) are used increasingly in health monitoring in such instances. Additionally, the doctoral program in Electrical Engineering focuses on communications, control, signal processing, and computers.

Mechanical engineering
Mechanical engineering faculty are working on topics such as nanotechnology and biomechanical systems, micro-electro-mechanical systems, nano-electro-mechanical systems, and mechatronics.

Civil engineering
Civil engineering faculty work with the Texas Department of Transportation to provide measures to improve truck safety, to develop methods and materials to accelerate construction and opening of PCC pavements, and to establish processes for equipment replacement. Additionally, transportation engineering and infrastructure management research allows for optimization and redundancy in transportation systems.

Working with the Center for Water Research, additional research into water quality and the more efficient use of water is being conducted. The new doctoral program in Environmental Science and Engineering emphasizes natural resources, and engineering faculty work with geologists, environmental scientists, chemists, and hydrogeologists. Research areas include environmental analysis, restoration, and water resource research focuses on recovery and remediation, especially in understanding the fate and transport of surface and groundwater pollutants.

Biomedical engineering
Biomedical engineering faculty work on topics such as the contribution of Type I collagen
to mechanical properties of bone, importance of permeability in tissue engineering scaffolds, post-yield behavior of cortical bone, strengthening bioresorbable polymers, surface modification via formation of organic ultra thin films, and cell proliferation on scaffolds.

References

External links

Engineering schools and colleges in the United States
Engineering universities and colleges in Texas
Engineering